The men's 20 kilometres walk event at the 2008 African Championships in Athletics was held on May 4.

Results

References
Results (Archived)

2008 African Championships in Athletics
Racewalking at the African Championships in Athletics